The Eagle is a 1959 Polish war film directed by Leonard Buczkowski. It is based on the true story of the Polish World War II submarine . The film was entered into the 1st Moscow International Film Festival.

The story is inspired by the Orzeł incident, when Orzel, entered, in September 1939, the harbour of neutral Estonia and left its commanding officer with symptoms of illness. The Estonian authorities tried to intern the submarine, under pressure from Germany and the Soviet Union, but it escaped.

Cast
 Aleksander Sewruk as Commander Henryk Kłoczkowski 
 Wieńczysław Gliński as Captain Jan Grabiński
 Jan Machulski as Lieutenant Pilecki
 Roland Głowacki as Lieutenant Roland
 Bronisław Pawlik as Mate Rokosz
Andrzej Harder as Ensing Morawski
Zbigniew Filus as Bossman Wacał Pierzchała
Henryk Bąk as Bossman Leon Wiktorczyk
Ignacy Machowski as Bossman Marita
Czesław Piaskowski as Bossman Serafin

See also 
 Cinema of Poland
 List of Polish language films
 Submarine films

References

External links
 
The Eagle on Filmweb (polish)

1959 films
1950s Polish-language films
World War II submarine films
Polish black-and-white films
Films set in the Baltic Sea
Polish war films
1959 war films
Polish World War II films
Films set in Estonia
Films set in Tallinn